Miss America 1924, the fourth Miss America pageant, was held at the Million Dollar Pier in Atlantic City, New Jersey on Saturday, September 6, 1924. Mary Katherine Campbell, who won the title the previous two years, placed as 1st runner-up. Pageant officials later instituted a rule allowing competitors to be crowned only once. Ruth Malcomson competing as Miss Philadelphia was named Miss America of 1924 against a field of 83 entrants, the largest number of contestants in Miss America history.

Second runner-up Fay Lanphier would become Miss America 1925. Another of the finalists, Beatrice Roberts, became an actress who appeared in more than 50 Hollywood productions.

Results

Contestants

References

Secondary sources

External links
 Miss America official website

1924
1924 in the United States
1924 in New Jersey
September 1924 events
Events in Atlantic City, New Jersey